The following is a list of film, television, theatre, and radio credits of Irish-British actor Sir Michael Gambon.

Film

Television

Theatre

Radio

Video games

CDs 
 Vivaldi – The Four Seasons – Music and Sonnetts (2011) – Michael Gambon, Robert Atchison and the Altamira Chamber Orchestra

References

External links 
 
 

Male actor filmographies
Irish filmographies
British filmographies